Christos Papoutsis (born April 11, 1953) is a Greek socialist politician who has served as Minister for Citizen Protection (2010–12), Mercantile Marine Minister (2000–01) Member of the European Parliament (1984–95) and European Commissioner for Energy and Euratom Supply Agency, Small business and Tourism (1995–1999). He has also served as the Secretary of the Parliamentary Group and Parliamentary Spokesman for the Panhellenic Socialist Movement (PASOK), the majority party in Greece (2009–2010). He also was candidate for Mayor of Athens (2002).

Early life and education
He was born in Larissa, Greece, in 1953 and later moved to Athens where he studied Economics at the National and Kapodistrian University. After his university years he became politically active in the Democratic Movement against the Greek military junta – dictatorship- of 1967–1974.

Political career 

On July 12, 2013, he was appointed as Greece's Representative to the World Bank.

2010-2012 Minister of Citizen Protection

He served as Minister of Citizen Protection responsible for the national security of the country, with the PASOK government serving under Prime Minister George Papandreou (2010-2011), and in the coalition government under Prime Minister Lucas Papademos (2011-2012).
Member of the Governmental Council on Foreign Affairs and National Defense.
Represented Greece at the Justice and Home Affairs Council of European Union.

Major Achievements in that time:
Created a stable, integrated framework for the supervision and coordination of all state services for internal security and civil protection of the country. Introduced structural and functional changes upgrading the Hellenic Police, the Hellenic Coast Guard and the Fire Service. At the same time, modernized the institutional framework of the National Intelligence Service.

Established:
The Financial Police and the Cyber Crime Unit.
The Headquarters of the Hellenic Coast Guard.
A Coordination Unit for inter - service cooperation of the Hellenic Police, the Hellenic Coast Guard and the Fire Service.
The Independent Unit for the Management of European and Development Programs, monitoring the execution of the Budget and the sound financial management of all services of the Ministry.
Created new structures of the Greek State for the implementation of the European Asylum policy and handling of illegal migration:
The Asylum Service, in cooperation with the United Nations High Commissioner for Refugees and the European Asylum Support Office (EASO).
The Appeals Authority.
The First Reception Service for illegal immigrants with central and regional structure.
A joint force initiative with the participation of the Hellenic Police, the Hellenic Coast Guard and FRONTEX for the surveillance of land and sea borders of the country to tackle illegal immigration flows to Greece and Europe. To this end were developed:
An artificial barrier (fence) in the borderline between Greece and Turkey in Evros.
The border surveillance system with thermal cameras.
The National Border Management Coordination Center according to Schengen.
Further established:
Volunteer Fire Departments across the country.
A strategic plan for the full development of the European framework for civil protection.
For the first time in Greece issued national contingency plans for responding to natural disasters.
The Coast Guard Auxiliary for activating citizen volunteers.
A new legal framework tackling the phenomenon of modern piracy in merchant shipping.
The Office for dealing with arbitrary acts of uniformed officers.

2000-2012 Member of the Greek Parliament 
Member of the Greek Parliament for Athens (PASOK party) through four general elections (2000, 2004, 2007, 2009), following his return to Greece after 16 years of serving in the European Institutions.
During this period held the positions of:
Secretary of PASOK parliamentary group(2009-2010).
Parliamentary Spokesman (2007–2010) of the President of PASOK George Papandreou.
Vice Chairman of the Parliamentary Committee on European Affairs. Member of the Parliamentary Committee on Foreign Affairs and Defense policy.
Member of the Committee on Economic Policy.
Member of the Parliamentary Committee on Production and Trade.
Member of the  Committee on Environmental Protection.

Since 2000 he has been elected consecutively member of the Hellenic Parliament with PASOK (2000, 2004, 2007 and 2009 elections).

2002 Candidate for Mayor of Athens
In 2002 he was a candidate for Mayor of Athens in the local elections. As Leader of the Opposition served in the Municipal Council Athens (2002–2006) and participated in the preparation, organization and conduct of the 2004 Athens Olympics.

2000-2001 Minister of Mercantile Marine 

Minister of Mercantile Marine in the Government of PASOK under Prime Minister Costas Simitis. 
Represented Greece at the Transport Council of the European Union.
Promoted the competitiveness and prestige of the Hellenic Mercantile Marine with legislative initiatives for maritime safety, protection of the marine environment and the education of Greek seafarers. In particular:
Lifted Cabotage and deregulated Coastal Shipping, ensuring at the same time continuous connectivity of all the Greek islands.
Established the Regulatory Authority for Internal Maritime Transport to implement competition rules.
Introduced VTMIS (Vessel Traffic Monitoring & Information System) to monitor shipping in Greek seas and ports.
Formed, for the first time in Greece, a coherent policy for port development which included:
The establishment of the General Secretariat for Ports & Port Policy.
The promotion of the corporatisation of Piraeus Port Authority and Thessaloniki Port Authority.
The transformation of eleven Port Organisations of Strategic Importance - Alexandroupolis, Kavala, Volos, Patras, Igoumenitsa, Corfu, Eleusis, Lavrio, Rafina, Heraklion and Rhodes- into Corporations (S.A’s).
The transfer to Local Authorities responsibility for Port Funds, in coastal and island Greece.
Modernized and upgraded the Hellenic Coast Guard with new structures and uniform legislation for the first time since the founding law of 1919.
Modernized the air and sea vessels of the Coast Guard.
Presided over the start of the renovation of the building at “Vassiliadis Coast”, contributing to the regeneration of the wider area of Piraeus.

1995-1999 European Commissioner 
He was appointed European Commissioner for Energy under the Santer Presidency, with an extended portfolio pertaining to Energy, EURATOM Supply Agency, SMEs, Tourism and Social Economy. During his mandate  he put forward a series of policies in the areas of Green Energy, Enterprise Policy, Commerce, Tourism and Social Economy.

During 1995 to 1999 held the following positions/had the following responsibilities:
 
European Commissioner under the Presidency of the European Commission by Jacques Santer.
Responsible for Energy Policy and EURATOM Supply Agency, Enterprise Policy, Commerce, Tourism and Social Economy.
During his mandate, the European Commission has put forward as priority a combined European policy for energy and environmental protection with the adoption of the White Paper on European Energy Strategy", the White Paper and the Action Plan for the Promotion of Renewable Energy Sources.
Specific multi-annual programs were adopted (1998-2002)by the Commission concerning Renewable Energy Sources (ALTENER), the efficient use of energy (SAVE II), international energy cooperation (SYNERGY), the Environmental Technologies Action Plan for the promotion of eco-innovation and the use of environmental technologies (ETAP), the AUTO-OIL program.
The multi-annual action plan (1998-2002) for the safety of nuclear facilities and the safe transfer of radio-active materials was approved, negotiations were concluded and the pact for the nuclear energy was signed between the E.U. and the U.S.A..
Held a leading role in the completion of negotiations and the adoption of the Directives on the deregulation of the internal electricity and natural gas markets, which led to the creation of European Internal Energy Market.
The Trans-European Energy Networks planning was completed.
Regional cooperation in the energy sector of the EU with the Mediterranean countries, the countries of Southeastern Europe and the Baltic emerged as priority.
Established a  durable framework for energy cooperation between the EU Russia and China.
 
Furthermore:
A comprehensive and contemporary policy for entrepreneurship and the strengthening of competitiveness was formulated.
Formulation and adoption by the Commission of the Directive to tackle late payments in commercial transactions, the Recommendation for the promotion of Entrepreneurship and the Initiative for Growth and Employment.
Several legislative initiatives and multi-annual programs were launched in support of SMEs, Commerce, Craft and Social Economy.
Several international meetings of EU business cooperation with the U.S., Latin America, Middle East, China and ASEAN countries were organised.
The Green and the White Papers on Commerce were adopted as well as a package of policies to reinforce commerce in agreement with the representatives of the EU member states, Chambers of Commerce and workers.
Presented for the first time: The Green Paper on Tourism,The first multi-annual program (PHILOXENIA) to enhance the tourism industry, The multi-annual program (1995-1997) to support co-operatives, mutual societies, associations and foundations in the EU.

1984-1995 Member of the European Parliament  

From 1984 to 1995, he was elected Member of the European Parliament for three consecutive terms (1984, 1989, 1994). During this period he held the positions of Vice-President of the Socialist Group of the European Parliament (1987–1994) and Head of PASOK MEP delegation in the European Parliament (1989–1994).

Along with his mandate in the European Parliament, he served as International Relations Secretary and PASOK Representative at the Socialist International, from 1988 to 1994.

During 1984 - 1995 period held the following positions:

 Vice president of the Parliamentary Group of the European Socialist Party at the European Parliament (1987-1994).
 Head of PASOK MEP’s (1987-1994).
 Member of the Budget Committee.
 Member of the Committee on Economic, Monetary and Industrial Policy.
 Member of the Committee on Foreign Affairs, Security and Defense Policy.
 Member of the Inter-parliamentary delegation E.P.-USA Congress on relations between the European Union and the U.S. (1990 – 1995).
 Vice-President of the Inter-Parliamentary delegation E.P.-Canada (1984 – 1989).

Further Political Activities and Positions held 

 Participated in the student movement against dictatorship, the uprisings of the Law School of the Athens University and the National Technical University of Athens in 1973.
 With the restoration of Democracy in Greece in 1974, became a member of PASOK, under the leadership of Andreas Papandreou.
 Actively involved in the student movement as President of the National Student Union of Greece (EFEE 1978-1980).
 Deputy Secretary of PASOK Youth (1978-1981).
 Member of the Central Committee of PASOK (1977-2012) and repeatedly elected member of the Executive Bureau of PASOK (1995-2003).
 Secretary of Organizing Policy of the Central Committee of PASOK (1982-1985).
 Secretary of PASOK International Relations (1986-1995).
 Member of the Bureau of the European Socialist Party (1988-1995).
 Representative of the President Andreas Papandreou and PASOK at the Socialist International at the time of the presidency of Willy Brandt and Pierre Maurois.

During his tenure in the European Commission and the Minister for Citizen Protection, he collaborated his various High E.U. officials, such as Commissioner Cecilia Malmström and Director Wainwright.

Awards

During his political career he has been accredited with the following awards:

 Highest Mark of Distinction by the President of the Republic of Chile, the Gran Official of the Orden Libertador Bernardo O'Higgins, for his contribution to the restoration of democracy in Chile (April 15, 1998).
 Highest Mark of Distinction, with Cross, by the President of the Republic of Austria for his contribution to the accession of Austria to the European Union, (May 18, 1995).

Personal life
Christos Papoutsis is married to Ioulia Taliouri.
Their daughter, Zoi Melina holds a bachelor's degree from the School of Economics of the Athens University of Economics and Business and a master's degree from Yale University.

Publications 

 European Destinations, by Christos Papoutsis, 1994, 
 The Colour of the Future, by Christos Papoutsis, 1998, 
 For Europe in the 21st Century, by Christos Papoutsis, 1999,

References

External links 
 Official Website of Christos Papoutsis 
 Official Page of Christos Papoutsis on Facebook
 Official Account of Christos Papoutsis on Twitter
 
 

|-

|-

|-

|-

1953 births
Living people
Politicians from Larissa
National and Kapodistrian University of Athens alumni
Greek European Commissioners
PASOK politicians
Greek MPs 2000–2004
Greek MPs 2004–2007
Greek MPs 2007–2009
Greek MPs 2009–2012
MEPs for Greece 1984–1989
MEPs for Greece 1989–1994
PASOK MEPs
Ministers of Public Order of Greece
Ministers for Mercantile Marine of Greece